Belaya Gora Airport  is an airport serving the urban locality of Belaya Gora, Abyysky District, in the Sakha Republic of Russia.

Airlines and destinations

References

External links

Airports built in the Soviet Union
Airports in the Arctic
Airports in the Sakha Republic